The Medical Act 1876 (39 & 40 Vict c 41) was an act which repealed the previous Medical Act in the United Kingdom and allowed all British medical authorities to license all qualified applicants whatever their gender. It was introduced by Parliament member Russell Gurney. The Act obtained the queen's assent and became law despite Queen Victoria's strong private objections to women's medical training.

The Medical Acts was the collective title of the Medical Act 1876 as well as the following Acts:
Medical Act 1858 (21 & 22 Vict c 90)
Medical Act 1859 (22 Vict c 21)
Medical Acts Amendment Act 1860 (23 & 24 Vict c 7)
Medical Practitioners Act 1876 (39 & 40 Vict c 40)
Medical Act 1886 (49 & 50 Vict c 48)

References

Medical regulation in the United Kingdom
United Kingdom Acts of Parliament 1876